Joanna Gadzina (born 1 September 1992) is a Polish handball player. She plays for the club Pogoń Szczecin and is member of the Polish national team. She competed at the 2015 World Women's Handball Championship in Denmark.

References

1992 births
Living people
Polish female handball players
Sportspeople from Nowy Sącz
21st-century Polish women